Parapomecyna flavomaculata is a species of beetle in the family Cerambycidae, and the only species in the genus Parapomecyna. It was described by Breuning in 1968.

References

Apomecynini
Beetles described in 1968
Monotypic beetle genera